Luis Martínez (born September 26, 1982) is an American professional wrestler of Puerto Rican descent. He is currently signed to WWE, where he performs on the Raw brand under the ring name Damian Priest, and is a member of the stable The Judgment Day.

He is also known for his work in Ring of Honor (ROH) under the ring name Punishment Martinez, where he is a former one-time ROH World Television Champion. Through ROH's working relationship with New Japan Pro-Wrestling (NJPW), he has also worked in Japan as Punisher Martinez.

Early life
Martínez was born in New York City to Newyorican parents, but raised in the municipality of Dorado, Puerto Rico. While living in Dorado he saw the World Wrestling Council on television and got the interest to become a pro wrestler. He learned Japanese Gōjū-ryū karate from his martial artist father. After winning two national championships in full-contact martial arts, Martínez decided to embark on a career in professional wrestling. When he returned to the States, Spanish was still his first language and he underwent a period of cultural adaptation.

Professional wrestling career

Early career
Martínez trained at the Monster Factory and went on to win several titles in Monster Factory Pro Wrestling. In 2014, Martínez attended a Ring of Honor (ROH) training camp and went on to train at the ROH dojo.

Ring of Honor (2015–2018)
His first appearance at a ROH show was in 2015 under his real name, Luis Martínez, where he competed in two dark matches, losing the first to The Romantic Touch and winning the second alongside Shaheem Ali against Hellcat and Mattick.

Martínez made his return in Ring of Honor, billed as "Punisher Martinez", at the ROH Top Prospect Tournament where he defeated Colby Corino in the first round. Martinez lost to Lio Rush in the semifinals; however, in spite of the loss, Martinez was signed to a contract by Ring of Honor. He subsequently established himself as a villain when he aligned himself with B. J. Whitmer and Kevin Sullivan, entering a rivalry with their adversary Steve Corino. On September 16, 2016, Martinez took part in the 2016 Honor Rumble, where he had an impressive showing before ultimately being eliminated. In early November he participated in the 2016 Survival of the Fittest, where he ended up being eliminated in the final Six Man Mayhem match. Martinez and Whitmer went on to briefly feud with the former ROH World Tag Team Champions War Machine (Hanson and Raymond Rowe), first wrestling them to a no contest and then defeating them in an anything goes match.

Through ROH's working relationship with New Japan Pro-Wrestling (NJPW), Martinez appeared at the two-day Honor Rising: Japan 2017 event. On the first night, Martinez teamed up with Los Ingobernables de Japón members Hiromu Takahashi and Tetsuya Naito to defeat Dalton Castle, Hiroshi Tanahashi and Ryusuke Taguchi, with Martinez picking up the win for his team. On the second night, Martinez unsuccessfully challenged Hirooki Goto for the NEVER Openweight Championship. Using the name Damian Martinez, he returned to ROH to unsuccessfully compete in a Manhattan Mayhem Battle Royal for the #1 Contendership to the ROH World Championship. Martinez also entered a Battle Royal for the #1 Contendership to the ROH World Television Championship, which he also lost. On February 11, Martinez and B. J. Whitmer defeated War Machine, but after the match Martinez turned on Whitmer by hitting him with his South of Heaven finishing maneuver.

Martinez won his first championship in ROH on June 16, 2018, defeating Silas Young for the World Television Championship at night two of the Promotion's "State of the Art" event in Dallas, Texas. Martinez had qualified for an opportunity at said championship earlier that same evening by pinning Cheeseburger in a six-way Proving Ground match. Martinez would make another successful title defense at Best in the World 2018 against "Hangman" Adam Page in a Baltimore Street Fight. At Death Before Dishonor XVI, he successfully defended the title against Chris Sabin. After the match, he attacked Sabin, until Jeff Cobb made the save. On September 29, his contract with Ring of Honor expired and he opted out of a contract offer. In his final appearance for the promotion, Martinez dropped the Television Championship against Cobb.

WWE

Early beginnings (2018–2020)
On October 12, 2018, it was reported that Martinez had signed a contract with WWE; six days later he was formally introduced among other new members to the NXT brand. At an NXT taping on December 5, he made his debut as a heel, losing to Matt Riddle. On April 15, 2019, it was reported that Martinez would be repackaged as "Damian Priest", although he still used the "Punishment Martinez" name in house shows. Vignettes soon began airing which reintroduced Martinez as Damian Priest. On the June 19, 2019 episode of NXT, he made his debut under the character, defeating Raul Mendoza. On the July 24 episode of NXT, he defeated Keith Lee in his second appearance.

On the October 2 episode of NXT, Priest started a feud with Pete Dunne and Killian Dain, culminating in a triple threat match at NXT TakeOver: WarGames on November 23 for #1 contendership to the NXT Championship, in which Dunne was victorious. Priest was also a part of the 5-on-5-on-5 Survivor Series pay-per-view match the following day, representing Team NXT in a losing effort to Team SmackDown and Team Raw, where he was eliminated by Randy Orton. In January 2020, Priest was included in a storyline around the NXT North American Championship with Keith Lee and Dominik Dijajkovic. Priest would have an opportunity for the title against Lee and Dijakovic on April 1, and a singles match against Lee on April 22, but lost both times.

NXT North American Champion (2020–2021)
On the April 22 episode of NXT, Finn Bálor was attacked backstage by an unknown attacker. Priest was revealed as the unknown attacker on the May 13 episode of NXT, culminating in a match between the two at TakeOver: In Your House on June 7, where Priest lost to Bálor. Despite losing the match, his performance was highly praised by Triple H, and on the June 10 episode of NXT, he praised Bálor during a backstage segment, turning face in the process.

On the August 5 episode of NXT, Priest defeated Oney Lorcan and Ridge Holland to qualify for the NXT North American Championship ladder match at NXT TakeOver: XXX on August 22. At the event, Priest won the title, earning his first championship in WWE. He made his first title defense on the September 16 episode of NXT, defeating Timothy Thatcher. The following week, NXT General Manager William Regal announced that Priest would defend the title against Johnny Gargano at NXT: TakeOver 31 on October 4, in which he successfully retained the title. However, Priest lost the title to Gargano at Halloween Havoc on October 28 in a Devil's Playground match, ending his reign at 65 days. 

On the November 11 episode of NXT, Priest distracted Gargano during his title defense against Leon Ruff, which caused Gargano to lose the title to Ruff. The following week, Ruff retained the title against Gargano by disqualification after Priest punched Ruff during the match, disabling Gargano to win the title. This soon transitioned into a triple threat match for the NXT North American Championship, which took place at NXT TakeOver: WarGames on December 6. During the match, Priest was attacked by a masked character and its gang that attacked him previously at Halloween Havoc, who was soon revealed to be Austin Theory; as a result, Priest lost the match with Gargano winning the title by pinning Ruff.

On the December 9 episode of NXT, Priest looked forward for revenge against Theory, but was viciously attacked by a returning Karrion Kross from behind. The following week, Kross challenged Priest to a match at New Year's Evil, which Priest accepted. At New Year's Evil on January 6, Priest lost to Kross in his final match in NXT.

Main roster debut and United States Champion (2021–2022)
At the Royal Rumble pay-per-view on January 31, 2021, he entered at #14, eliminating John Morrison, The Miz, Elias and Kane before being eliminated by Bobby Lashley. A day later, Priest made his debut on Raw after being introduced by Bad Bunny during a Miz TV segment, while defeating Miz later that night. On the February 15 episode of Raw, Priest helped Bad Bunny win the 24/7 Championship by knocking out Akira Tozawa, who pinned R-Truth moments ago. Over the following weeks, Priest began a winning streak, defeating the likes of Angel Garza, Elias, and Jaxson Ryker. On the April 5 episode of Raw, Priest and Bad Bunny challenged The Miz and John Morrison to a tag team match at WrestleMania 37, which they accepted. On the first night of the event on April 10, Priest and Bad Bunny defeated The Miz and Morrison. On the Raw after WrestleMania, The Miz and Morrison challenged Damian Priest to a 2-on-1 handicap match, but despite dominating most of the match, Priest lost due to outside interference by Maryse, marking his first loss on the main roster. They continued their feud, which set up a lumberjack match between The Miz and Priest at WrestleMania Backlash on May 16 that Priest won. Briefly after, he took time off due to a back injury.

On the July 12 episode of Raw, Priest returned to save Humberto Carrillo from attack by Sheamus, the reigning United States Champion after their title match, thus starting a rivalry between Priest and Sheamus. Priest challenged Sheamus to a match at SummerSlam for the title on the August 9 episode of Raw, which Sheamus accepted. At SummerSlam on August 21, Priest defeated Sheamus to win the United States Championship for the first time in his career. On the August 30 episode of Raw, he retained the title against Sheamus and Drew McIntyre in a triple threat match. On the September 6 episode of Raw, Sheamus defeated McIntyre to earn his rematch against Priest at Extreme Rules. Priest retained the title against Jeff Hardy on the September 13 episode of Raw. At Extreme Rules on September 26, Priest retained the title in a triple threat match against Sheamus and Hardy. On the following episode of Raw, Priest retained the title against Sheamus in a no disqualification, no countout match, ending their feud.

On the October 25 episode of Raw, with a new, revamped character, he defeated T-Bar when the latter threw a chair at the former outside the ring; as a result, Priest viciously attacked T-Bar, turning himself into a tweener. At Survivor Series on November 21, Priest lost to Intercontinental Champion Shinsuke Nakamura by disqualification in a champion vs. champion match after his ally Rick Boogs repeatedly distracted Priest, despite the latter warning the former not to do it. After another distraction, Priest attacked both Nakamura and Boogs, thus losing the match by disqualification, making it his second loss on the main roster. On the following episode of Raw, he retained the title against Sami Zayn, and against Apollo Crews, Robert Roode, and Dolph Ziggler in the following weeks.

On the February 14 episode of Raw, he retained the title against AJ Styles. The following week, he retained against Shelton Benjamin, before getting challenged by Finn Bálor after the match. On the February 28 episode of Raw, Priest lost the United States Championship to Balor, ending his reign at 191 days. After the match, Priest attacked Bálor, fully turning heel for the first time since May 2020 and the first time on the main roster.

The Judgment Day (2022–present) 

 
On the second night of WrestleMania 38 on April 3, Priest distracted AJ Styles during his match against Edge, causing Styles to lose the match. After the match, Edge celebrated his victory with Priest, starting an alliance between the two. On the April 25 edition of Raw, Edge and Priest were dubbed The Judgment Day after which Priest defeated Bálor in a singles match. At Hell in a Cell on June 5, The Judgment Day (Edge, Priest and Rhea Ripley) defeated Styles, Finn Bálor and Liv Morgan in a six-person mixed tag team match. The next night on Raw, Edge introduced Bálor as the newest member of The Judgment Day. However, Bálor, Priest and Ripley suddenly attacked Edge, kicking him out of the stable. The Judgment Day then began a feud with the Mysterios (Rey and Dominik) in an attempt to recruit Dominik into their ranks. At SummerSlam on July 30, Priest and Bálor were defeated by the Mysterios following interference from a returning Edge. At Clash at the Castle, Priest and Bálor lost to Edge and Rey Mysterio in a tag team match, where Dominik turned heel on both of them to join The Judgment Day. On November 5, at Crown Jewel, Priest, Bálor, and Dominik defeated The O.C. (Styles, Luke Gallows, and Karl Anderson) in a six-man tag team match after interference from Ripley. On the November 28 episode of Raw, The Judgment Day defeated The O.C in an eight-person mixed tag team match to end their feud.

On the January 9, 2023 episode of Raw, Priest, Bálor and Dominik won a tag team turmoil match for a Raw Tag Team Championship opportunity against The Usos. At Raw is XXX on January 23, The Usos successfully defended the championship against Priest and Dominik despite Jimmy Uso's injury, with Sami Zayn taking Jimmy's place. At the Royal Rumble on January 28, Priest entered the Royal Rumble match at #22 and although he and Balor were eliminated by the returning Edge, they eliminated him as a result with help from Dominik afterwards. On the February 6 episode of Raw, Priest defeated Angelo Dawkins to qualify for the Elimination Chamber match for the United States Championship. At Elimination Chamber on February 18, Priest failed to win the title inside the namesake structure.

Professional wrestling style and persona
Martinez is known to have a deep voice, which has helped him in his promos to maintain the menacing, dark character while working as Punishment Martinez in ROH Wrestling. In WWE, "Damian Priest" was previously intended to be a similar, but darker, more intense character than the characters that Martinez has represented previously in other promotions, however, his character gradually evolved and developed a more machismo, rockstar-like attitude that pursues more fame, recognition and success, and the character is further emphasized by portraying bars, parties and women frequently with him in backstage segments. Therefore, he has been referred to as "The Archer of Infamy".

On the October 25 episode of Raw, Martinez debuted a new theme song, new mannerisms, and a slightly changed appearance, suggesting a character change. The new character and the theme song culminates two sides of Priest: one side is the calm, composed side known as "The Priest", similar to his previous character, and the other is a new darker, fiercer side known as "The Damian", which would be seen if Priest would get provoked or disrespected. 

His wrestling style involves various power moves as well as high flying moves, and his striking is heavily influenced by his background in martial arts. He uses the Razor's Edge (a crucifix powerbomb, inherited from Razor Ramon, his childhood wrestling idol) and also a release suplex slam which has been dubbed Broken Arrow. His finisher is a rolling cutter called The Reckoning. After debuting on the main roster, it was renamed Hit The Lights since the 2021 Royal Rumble, potentially due to sharing the name with Mia Yim, also known as "Reckoning" at the time, as a member of Retribution. The name was reverted back to The Reckoning on July 26, 2021 episode of Raw. He also used a sitout chokeslam called the South of Heaven as his finisher, when he was working with ROH, which he still uses in the WWE as one of his signature moves, but not as a finisher.

Personal life 
Martinez is a melophile, being heavily influenced by rock and heavy metal. He and his family has known and interacted with various music bands and personalities, like Bad Bunny, Dee Snider, and Eddie Ojeda.

Martinez is also a big fan and a collector of hand-to-hand combat weapons.

Martinez' inspirations in wrestling are Pedro Morales, Scott Hall and The Undertaker. He is friends with Keith Lee, Matt Riddle and Rhea Ripley.

Championships and accomplishments
Keystone Pro Wrestling
KPW Tag Team Championship (1 time) – with Matthew Riddle
Monster Factory Pro Wrestling
MFPW Heavyweight Championship (3 times)
MFPW Tag Team Championship (2 times) – with Brolly (1) and Q. T. Marshall (1)
MFPW Invitational (2016)
Pro Wrestling Illustrated
Ranked No. 85 of the top 500 singles wrestlers in the PWI 500 in 2021
Ring of Honor
ROH World Television Championship (1 time)
Survival of the Fittest (2017)
WWE
 WWE United States Championship (1 time)
 NXT North American Championship (1 time)
 Wrestling Observer Newsletter
 Worst Match of the Year (2021)

References

External links

 
 
 
 
 

1982 births
American male professional wrestlers
American sportspeople of Puerto Rican descent
Entertainers from the Bronx
Gōjū-ryū practitioners
American male karateka
Living people
NXT North American Champions
NWA/WCW/WWE United States Heavyweight Champions
Professional wrestlers from New York (state)
Puerto Rican male professional wrestlers
ROH World Television Champions
Sportspeople from the Bronx
21st-century professional wrestlers
Professional wrestlers from New York City